Jungle Master is a 2013 Chinese computer-animated film directed by Kerr Xu. The English dub was written by Steve Kramer and features the voices of Victoria Justice, David Spade, Josh Peck, Jon Lovitz, Christopher Lloyd, and Jane Lynch.

In 2016, there was a sequel to the film titled Jungle Master 2: Candy Planet.

Plot

When a girl named Rainie runs away from home after her mom Ilene forgot about her 12th birthday, she is accidentally transported from the big city to an enchanted jungle planet where she meets a Lumore named Blue. With the help of Blue's adoptive grandfather Dr. Sedgewick and their newfound friends Mulla and Tulla, they embark on an epic adventure to help Blue become the leader he is destined to be and save the rainforest from Ilene and Dr. Sedgwick's villainous boss named Boss Cain.

Cast
 Li Chuanying
 Yuling Jiang
 Yang Menglu
 Gao Qichang
 Xiaobing Wang
 Zhang Xin
 Anqi Zhang
 Li Zhengxiang

English cast

Jungle Master (2013)

 Victoria Justice as Rainie, a 12-year-old girl who is accidentally transported to the jungle planet.
 David Spade as Boss Cain, a crooked businessman who wants to use the material from the jungle planet to preserve the Earth.
 Josh Peck as Blue, a Lumore who Rainie befriends.
 Jon Lovitz as Mulla, a Lumore who helps Blue through his rite of passage.
 Christopher Lloyd as Dr. Sedgwick, a scientist operating on the jungle planet who adopts Blue.
 Jane Lynch as Ilene, the workaholic mother of Rainie.
 Michael McConnohie as Dr. Wells, one of the scientists that works for Boss Cain.
 Shondalia White as Tulla, a Lumore who is a friend of Mulla and helps Blue through his rite of passage.
 Jason Sarayba as Justin, a friend of Ilene.

Additional voices by Bill J. Gottlieb, Wes Hubbard, Steve Kramer, and Michelle Ruff.

Jungle Master 2 Candy Planet (2016 & 2020)

 Cherami Leigh - Rainie (formerly Victoria Justice)
 Robbie Daymond - Blue (formerly Josh Peck)
 Steve Prince - Mulla (formerly Jon Lovitz)
 Cam Clarke - Jonbon 
 Sandy Fox - Bonbon & Sprinkles 
 Dorothy Fahn - Ilene (formerly Jane Lynch)
 Todd Haberkorn - Gordon 
 Michael P. Greco - Harry 
 Bob Glouberman - Glaze 
 Doug Stone - Honeybun 
 and Shondalia White - Tulla Part 2

References

External links

2013 films
2013 computer-animated films
2013 comedy films
2010s adventure comedy films
2010s Mandarin-language films
Chinese computer-animated films
Mockbuster films
Films set in jungles